Fukushima Azuma Baseball Stadium is a multi-purpose stadium in Fukushima, Japan.  It is currently used mostly for baseball matches.  The stadium was originally opened in 1986 and has a capacity of 30,000 spectators.

It was the baseball and softball venue for tournament opening matches at the 2020 Summer Olympics.

References

External links
 

Baseball venues in Japan
Multi-purpose stadiums in Japan
Sports venues in Fukushima Prefecture
Venues of the 2020 Summer Olympics
Olympic baseball venues
Olympic softball venues
Fukushima (city)